Catherston Leweston is a small village and civil parish in the county of Dorset in southwest England. The Dorset County Council estimated that the population of the parish was 30(as of 2013).

The village's Tudor-style manor house was built in 1887 and the Blue Lias-built church dates from 1858. Part of an earlier medieval manor house belonging to the Wadham family of Catherston, a cadet branch of the family that founded Wadham College, Oxford, remains beside the later house.

References

External links
Parish Church of St Mary

Villages in Dorset